Klečevce is a village in the municipality of Kumanovo, North Macedonia. It used to be a municipality of its own.

Demographics
According to the 2002 census, the village had a total of 573 inhabitants. Ethnic groups in the village include:

Macedonians 555
Serbs 17
Others 1

References

Villages in Kumanovo Municipality